FC Teningen is a German association football club from Teningen, Baden.



History
The association was founded in 1929 named TuS Teningen and from 1946 to 1949 SpV Teningen. 2000, the team captured the division title and was promoted to the Oberliga Baden-Württemberg (V). It was relegated from the Oberliga after only one season, back to the Verbandsliga. In 2007 it dropped to the Landesliga Südbaden and, in 2015, suffered relegation to the Bezirksliga.

FC also won the South Baden Cup three times, which earned the club a place in the DFB-Pokal (German Cup) tournament. In 2000–01 they lost against MSV Duisburg 0–3, four years later during the 2004–05 DFB-Pokal they played against 1. FC Nürnberg but lost 1–2. In June 2011 the club was drawn against FC Schalke 04 in the 2011–12 DFB-Pokal. The Bundesliga club overwhelmed Teningen 11–1.

Honours
The club's honours:

League
 Verbandsliga Südbaden
 Champions: 2000, 2002

Cup
 South Baden Cup
 Winners: 2000, 2004, 2011
 Runners-up: 2001

Recent managers
Recent managers of the club:

Recent seasons
The recent season-by-season performance of the club:

 With the introduction of the Regionalligas in 1994 and the 3. Liga in 2008 as the new third tier, below the 2. Bundesliga, all leagues below dropped one tier.

References

External links
Official website 
FC Teningen profile at Weltfussball
Weltfussballarchiv profile
Das deutsche Fußball-Archiv historical German domestic league tables 

Association football clubs established in 1929
Football clubs in Germany
Football clubs in Baden-Württemberg
1929 establishments in Germany